Daniel of Moscopole or Daniil of Moscopole (1754–1825;  or), also known as Mihali Adami Hagi, was an Aromanian scholar from Moscopole and student of Theodoros Kavalliotis, an 18th/19th-century professor and director of New Academy of Moscopole.

Works
Daniel was an Aromanian. In this period, Moscopole was an important Balkan city, the cultural and commercial center of the Aromanians and the site of the first printing press working in the Balkans.

Daniel, in his work, Εισαγωγική Διδασκαλία ("Introductory Instruction"), compiled a combined dictionary of Greek (Romaika), Aromanian (Vlachika), Bulgarian (Vulgarika) and Albanian (Alvanitika). Daniel invited non-Greek speakers with this dictionary to learn the Greek language:

Despite promoting the Greek language, Aromanian was Daniel's mother tongue. Furthermore, according to the Bulgarian scholar Aleksandăr Ničev, he did not know Greek very well.

In 1794, he published in Venice a dictionary of four modern Balkan languages (Greek, Albanian, Aromanian and Bulgarian). Many authors published his works in Greek and in Aromanian in the Greek alphabet. With his lexicographic work, Daniel hoped to persuade the Albanians, Aromanians and Bulgarians to abandon their "barbaric" tongues and learn Greek, the "mother of knowledge". The book was republished in 1802 in Dubrovnik or Venice.

External links
 Εισαγωγική Διδασκαλία (Introductory instruction), 1802

References

1725 births
1825 deaths
Aromanian people
People from Moscopole
Aromanians from the Ottoman Empire
Pro-Greek Aromanians
Aromanian academics